The 1994 San Francisco Giants season was the Giants' 112th season in Major League Baseball, their 37th season in San Francisco since their move from New York following the 1957 season, and their 35th at Candlestick Park. After winning 103 games in 1993, the Giants record dropped to 55–60 in a strike-shortened season. This was also the season in which Matt Williams hit a career high 43 home runs through 115 games by the time the strike hit, on pace to finish with 61; had the season continued, Williams may have had a chance to break Roger Maris's then-single season record of 61 home runs set in 1961.

Offseason
November 21, 1993: Mark Portugal signed as a free agent with the San Francisco Giants.
December 20, 1993: Rex Hudler was signed as a free agent with the San Francisco Giants.
March 22, 1994: Rex Hudler was released by the San Francisco Giants.

Regular season

By Friday, August 12, the Giants had compiled a 55-60 record through 115 games. They had scored 504 runs (4.38 per game) and allowed 500 runs (4.35 per game).

The Giants were struggling offensively prior to the strike, at 28th in batting average (.249), doubles (159) and overall hits (963).

Their pitchers also struggled, combining to finish 28th in complete games, with just 2.

Notable transactions
 June 19, 1994: Darryl Strawberry signed as a free agent with the San Francisco Giants.
 June 29, 1994: Kent Bottenfield was signed as a free agent with the San Francisco Giants.
 September 14, 1994: Yorvit Torrealba was signed by the San Francisco Giants as an amateur free agent.

Draft picks

The following were notable Giants draft picks from the MLB Amateur Draft held on June 2, 1994.

Opening Day Starters
Todd Benzinger
Barry Bonds
John Burkett
Royce Clayton
Darren Lewis
Kirt Manwaring
Willie McGee
Robby Thompson
Matt Williams

Season standings

Record vs. opponents

Roster

Player stats

Batting
Note: Pos= Position; G = Games played; AB = At bats; H = Hits; HR = Home runs; RBI = Runs batted in; Avg. = Batting average

Other batters
Note: G = Games played; AB = At bats; H = Hits; Avg. = Batting average; HR = Home runs; RBI = Runs batted in

Starting pitchers 
Note: G = Games pitched; IP = Innings pitched; W = Wins; L = Losses; ERA = Earned run average; SO = Strikeouts

Other pitchers 
Note: G = Games pitched; IP = Innings pitched; W = Wins; L = Losses; ERA = Earned run average; SO = Strikeouts

Relief pitchers 
Note: G = Games pitched; W = Wins; L = Losses; SV = Saves; ERA = Earned run average; SO = Strikeouts

Awards and honors
 Mark Leiter P, Willie Mac Award
All-Star Game

Farm system

References

External links
 1994 San Francisco Giants at Baseball Reference
 1994 San Francisco Giants at Baseball Almanac

San Francisco Giants seasons
San Francisco Giants Season, 1994
San Francisco Giants Season, 1994
San Fran